Dana Gas PJSC is a publicly traded natural gas company, based in Sharjah, United Arab Emirates (UAE). Incorporated and listed on the Abu Dhabi Securities Exchange in 2005, Dana Gas is the largest non-government owned natural gas company in the Middle East, with operations in Egypt, Iraqi Kurdistan, and the UAE. The company and Crescent Petroleum have equal stakes in the Pearl Petroleum consortium. Hamid Dhia Jafar and Patrick Allman-Ward serve as chairman and chief executive officer of Dana Gas, respectively.

History
Dana Gas was incorporated and listed on the Abu Dhabi Securities Exchange in 2005 with founder shareholders being Crescent Petroleum, the Sharjah government, and hundreds of regional businesses and other individuals. The original project was to supply gas to the northern Arab Emirates from Iran based upon a gas supply agreement that was made between Crescent Petroleum and the National Iranian Oil Company (NIOC) in 2001.

In January 2007, Dana acquired Calgary-based Centurion Energy in the US$1 billion deal. Centurion had assets in Egypt, Tunisia, and West Africa at the time. Dana Gas raised $1 billion in convertible Islamic bonds, or sukuk, in London in 2007.

The 25-year agreement made between Crescent Petroleum and the NIOC resulted in completion of a pipeline from the Salman field to Sharjah. However, the pipeline has remained mostly unused because of allegations of corruption and a legal dispute. The pipeline was used briefly in 2010 when the NIOC sent gas to Dana Gas' Sharjah facility for testing purposes. In 2014, an international tribunal determined the agreement was binding, and NIOC should have been supplying gas since 2005 and should pay damages. As of late 2017, the parties (including Dana Gas) were awaiting the results of an arbitral tribunal in The Hague, following hearings to decide on the amount of damages that should be paid by NIOC to damaged parties to compensate for failing to supply the gas.

In May 2009, Dana Gas and Crescent Petroleum signed an agreement with MOL, OMV and RWE, shareholders of the Nabucco pipeline project, to create Pearl Petroleum for developing gas fields in Iraq's Kurdistan. As part of Pearl Petroleum, Dana Gas has had multiple disputes over rights and payments with the Kurdistan Regional Government (KRG). In 2013, Pearl Petroleum submitted a case against the KRG in the London Court of International Arbitration (LCIA), alleging the ruling body underpaid for gas liquid production and were denying other contractual rights. In November 2015, a London court ruled in the consortium's favor, confirming contractual rights for sole development and awarding damages for overdue payments totaling $1.98 billion. Another London court determined the KGR did not have sovereign immunity, and ordered full payment of $100 million within 30 days, but the parties agreed to a payment schedule. Dana Gas and RWE settled their dispute out of court, resulting in RWE acquiring a 10% stake in Dana Gas for an undisclosed amount. In February 2017, the LCIA determined the KRG had prevented Dana Gas from developing the Chemchemal and Khor Mor reservoirs, per the 2007 agreement. The court ordered the KRG to pay approximately $121 million plus interest for money owed; punitive damages would be determined later.

In April 2017, the International Court of Arbitration in London ruled in favor of the government's Ministry of Natural Resources, resulting in fewer payments to Dana Gas by the KRG. Pearl Petroleum then filed a petition one month later in a federal court in Washington, D.C., seeking damages of at least $26.5 billion because of project delays. The groups reached a financial settlement in August 2017, with the KRG paying $600 million (AED2.2 billion) to the companies, as well as $400 million (AED1.5 billion) for regional development. The settlement increased Dana Gas' cash balance and stock value. The KRG fell behind on payments to Dana Gas prior to the settlement, but all were submitted on time since the agreement was made.

Dana Gas and Crescent Petroleum started arbitration proceedings against MOL in September 2017 over the August agreement made by Dana Gas, the KRG, and Pearl Petroleum. MOL has a 10% stake in Pearl, and disagreed with the terms of the settlement. Before initiating proceedings, Dana Gas and Crescent Petroleum sold their shares of MOL in 2019.

Operations

Egypt
The company has operated in Egypt since 2007. Dana Gas is the nation's fifth largest gas producer, and had fourteen development leases, three exploration concessions, and two processing plants, as of May 2018.

During 2008–2009, Dana Gas discovered the Sondos-1 and 2 dry gas wells, the Azhar-1 gas/condensate well, and the Tulip-1 gas well. The company announced plans to develop an oil field in the Komombo basin south of Cairo in early 2010. In 2011, Dana Gas discovered the South Abu El Naga-2 dry gas well in the West El Manzala Concession, and was the sixth largest gas producer in the country. The company made two additional natural gas discoveries in 2012, and began operating a natural gas liquids plant. Commercial operations at the Allium-1 and West Sama-1 fields started in 2013, increasing gas production in Egypt by approximately 10%. Production for these fields occurs at the El Wastani and South El Manzala plants.

In 2014, two onshore concessions in the Nile Delta owned by the Egyptian Natural Gas Holding Company—North Al Salhiya (Block 1) and Al Matariya (Block 3)–were awarded to Dana Gas for six years. The two blocks had eleven and twelve wells, respectively, at the time, and joined Dana Gas' other Nile Delta concessions: the Al Manzala, West Al Manzala, and West Al Qantara. Dana Gas and BP formed a joint venture to drill the Al Matariya hydrocarbon exploration.

The company is expected to start drilling its first exploration offshore well, which targets one of these three prospects, in 2019. Dana Gas announced the completion of the Balsam-8 well in 2018.

Production at Zora is slated to end in 2019. Dana is considering sale of its Egypt assets.

Kurdistan Region of Iraq
Through the Pearl Petroleum consortium, Dana Gas and Crescent Petroleum operate the Chemchemal and Khor Mor (Sulaymaniyah Governorate) gas fields in Iraqi Kurdistan. Dana Gas has operated in Iraqi Kurdistan since 2007, and signed a ten-year gas sales agreement with the government in 2018. The Khor Mor plant, active since 2008, supplies natural gas to power stations in Bazian, Chemchemal, Erbil. By late 2018, the company had expanded the Khor Mor plant and implemented improvements to de-bottleneck, increasing production capacity by 30%.

Dana Gas and Crescent Petroleum struck a twenty-year gas sales agreement with the KRG in 2019, as part of Pearl Petroleum.

United Arab Emirates
In the United Arab Emirates (UAE), Dana Gas operates as offshore platform, pipeline, and onshore gas processing plant in the Zora gas field, near Sharjah. The company's $17 million contract for construction of the offshore platform was awarded to the Interserve subsidiary Adyard Abu Dhabi in November 2013. Commercial production began in 2016. The field yielded  of oil equivalent per day in 2016 and 2017, respectively.

Corporate affairs
Sharjah-based Dana Gas is the largest non-government owned natural gas company in the Middle East, with assets in Egypt, Iraqi Kurdistan, and the UAE. The company is listed on the Abu Dhabi Securities Exchange. Dana Gas and its partner Crescent Petroleum each have a 35% stake in the Pearl Petroleum consortium. Crescent Petroleum is Dana Gas' largest founding shareholder, with a nearly 20% stake.

Leadership
Patrick Allman-Ward, who joined Dana Gas in 2012, serves as the company's chief executive officer. He was appointed in 2013, replacing Rashid Saif Al Jarwan, who was serving as interim CEO following Ahmed al-Arbeed's retirement. Hamid Dhia Jafar began serving as chairman of the board of directors in 2015; Al Jarwan was elected to serve as vice chair at the same time. Chris Hearne serves as the current chief financial officer. Samantha Phillips serves as the current technical director.

Financials
Dana Gas reported a net profit of $83 million (AED304 million) for 2017, and a net loss of $186 million (AED681 million) for 2018. Dana Gas' net loss of $186 million (AED681 million) for 2018 has been attributed to the impairments in relation to the Zora gas field and other assets in Egypt.  The company reported earning gross revenues of USD $470 million (AED1.7 billion) for the fiscal year ending on December 31, 2018, a 4% increase over $450 million (AED1.6 billion) for 2017. In 2018, Dana Gas received $113 million from Pearl Petroleum, and reported a cash collection of $324 million (AED1.2 billion) for operations in Egypt, Iraqi Kurdistan, and Sharjah.

Sukuk
In 2012, Dana Gas became the first UAE company to not repay Islamic bonds on maturity, due to backlogged payments from Egypt and Iraqi Kurdistan. The company was owed more than US$500 million by customers, as of mid 2012. Dana Gas' five-year, $1 billion sukuk matured on October 31; $920 million was outstanding after the company repurchased approximately $80 million of the sukuk in 2008.

In 2017, Dana Gas entered a legal dispute after stopping payments on $700 million in sukuk, which the company said was no longer Shariah-compliant. The decision had potential to set a new precedent within the Islamic finance industry. The company initially offered to replace the sukuk with new securities producing a lower average current profit rate, then retracted the proposal in favor of adjudication following rejection by creditors. Dana Gas was set back by a series of rulings in the United Kingdom, and the British and UAE courts delivered conflicting rulings on the company's dividend payments. The sukuk matured in October, but remained unsettled.

In May 2018, Dana Gas and creditors represented by Deutsche Bank, including BlackRock and Goldman Sachs, agreed to issue new sukuk valued at $530 million. A majority of sukuk holders voted in favor of the agreement in June. Dana Gas completed the issuance, which was listed on Euronext Dublin, in August. The company completed its sukuk buyback program in 2019. The sukuk has a three-year life and will mature in October 2020.

References

External links
 

Oil and gas companies of the United Arab Emirates
Companies based in the Emirate of Sharjah
Energy companies established in 2005
Non-renewable resource companies established in 2005
Companies listed on the Abu Dhabi Securities Exchange
Emirati companies established in 2005